Rita Saffioti (born 26 May 1972) is an Australian politician. Representing the Australian Labor Party, she has been the member for the electoral district of West Swan in the Western Australian Legislative Assembly, the lower house of the Parliament of Western Australia, since 6 September 2008. Since 17 March 2017, she has been the minister for transport and minister for planning. Since 19 March 2021, she has also been the minister for ports. From 17 March 2017 to 13 December 2018, she was the minister for lands.

Early life and career
Saffioti was born on 26 May 1972 in Perth, Western Australia, to Nicodemo Saffioti, an orchardist, and Guiseppina Ienco, a cook's assistant. Saffioti's parents were post-war immigrants from the Italian region of Calabria. She grew up on an orchard in Roleystone in the Perth Hills with an older sister, and attended Roleystone Primary School, Roleystone District High School, and Kelmscott Senior High School, at which she became dux.

She graduated with a Bachelor of Business degree with distinction from Curtin University, majoring in economics. She then worked in Canberra and Perth for the Department of Finance and then in Perth for the Department of Treasury. She joined the Australian Labor Party in 1996, and from 1997, she worked as an economics adviser for Geoff Gallop, the leader of the opposition until 2001 and Premier of Western Australia following 2001. From February 2003 to February 2005, Saffioti was the director of the economics policy unit of the Department of the Premier and Cabinet. From February 2005 to January 2006, she was a strategic management advisor for the Office of the Premier. In January 2006, Alan Carpenter replaced Gallop as the premier. From January 2006 to April 2008, Saffioti was the chief of staff for the Office of the Premier. Following her preselection for the electoral district of West Swan, she worked as a strategic consultant for the Fremantle Football Club from April to July 2008.

Parliament
Saffioti unsuccessfully stood for election at the 2005 Western Australian state election. She was sixth place on the Labor Party's ticket for the East Metropolitan Region in the Western Australian Legislative Council (upper house). She won preselection for West Swan in April 2008, with Carpenter controversially hand-picking her over Swan Hills MP Jaye Radisich and the Labor Right's Belinda Coniglio. At the 2008 Western Australian state election on 6 September, Saffioti was elected to the newly-created electoral district of West Swan in the Western Australian Legislative Assembly, the lower house of the Parliament of Western Australia. She was re-elected at the elections in 2013, 2017 and 2021. Over its existence, West Swan has covered the north-eastern Perth suburbs of Ballajura, Caversham, Ellenbrook, Landsdale and parts of the Swan Valley.

From 9 April 2013 to 26 June 2015, Saffioti was the shadow minister for planning, finance, government accountability and women's interests. From 26 June 2015 to 11 March 2017, she was the shadow minister for planning, finance, transport and infrastructure.

On 17 March 2017, following the election of the McGowan government on 11 March 2017, Saffioti was appointed as the minister for transport, minister for planning, and minister for lands. She stopped being minister for lands on 13 December 2018, with Premier Mark McGowan saying it would enable Saffioti to focus more on Metronet, the government's expansion program for Perth's rail network. Ben Wyatt succeeded her as minister for lands. Following the 2021 election, on 19 March 2021, Saffioti became the minister for ports, as well as keeping her existing ministries.

Agencies under the responsibility of the minister for transport are the Department of Transport, Main Roads Western Australia and the Public Transport Authority. Agencies under the responsibility of the minister for planning are the Department of Planning, Lands and Heritage and the Western Australian Planning Commission. Agencies under the responsibility of the minister for ports are the Department of Transport, the Fremantle Port Authority, the Kimberley Ports Authority, the Mid West Ports Authority, the Pilbara Ports Authority and the Southern Ports Authority.

Upon becoming minister for transport, Saffioti cancelled the controversial Roe 8 highway project, which would have extended Roe Highway through the Beeliar Wetlands. The cancellation fulfiulled an election promise made by Labor. The contract for the project was renegotiated to instead construct three different road projects: duplication of Wanneroo Road between Joondalup Drive and Flynn Drive, connection between Murdoch Drive and Roe Highway, and duplication of Armadale Road between Tapper Road and Anstey Road. $46.9 million of taxpayer funds was written off by the decision to cancel Roe 8.

As the minister for transport and minister for planning, Saffioti has control over Metronet. Under Metronet, construction has started on the Morley–Ellenbrook line, an extension of the Joondalup line to Yanchep, an extension of the Armadale line to Byford, an extension of the Thornlie line to Cockburn Central on the Mandurah line, a new station at Lakelands on the Mandurah line, a rebuild of Bayswater station, Claremont station and Midland station, and the removal of several level crossings along the Armadale/Thornlie lines and Midland line. Railcar manufacturing was also brought back into Western Australia for the first time since the 1990s, with the Transperth C-series trains being manufactured in Bellevue, Western Australia. Redevelopment areas were established around Bayswater station and High Wycombe station in 2019. During the 2017 election campaign, Saffioti promised that all Metronet stage 1 projects would be finished within eight years.

Political views
Saffioti is one of six Labor MP's in the current state parliament that is not factionally aligned as of 2021. In 2010, she spoke out against parliament rules which prohibited her from taking her baby into the chamber. Government MPs Rob Johnson, Joe Francis and Vince Catania threatened to kick her out of the chamber under rules that meant strangers were not allowed in the chamber. Saffioti has also voiced support for a family room in Parliament House.

Personal life
Saffioti married Timothy Fraser on 21 October 2006 at the Perth Town Hall. They have two daughters and one son born via IVF. She was the first member of parliament to give birth in over 10 years, with the last time being Michelle Roberts in 1999. Saffioti is Catholic. She supports the Fremantle Football Club.

See also
Electoral results for the district of West Swan

References

Living people
Members of the Western Australian Legislative Assembly
1972 births
Australian Labor Party members of the Parliament of Western Australia
21st-century Australian politicians
21st-century Australian women politicians
Women members of the Western Australian Legislative Assembly
Australian politicians of Italian descent
Australian people of Calabrian descent
People from Perth, Western Australia